Andrean High School is a co-educational, college preparatory secondary school in Merrillville, Indiana. It is located in the Diocese of Gary.

The school was founded in 1959, and named for St. Andrew, the patron saint of the first bishop of the diocese of the Roman Catholic Diocese of Gary, Andrew Grutka. Through most of its history, Andrean has been staffed in part by members of the Basilian Fathers and the Sisters of Saints Cyril and Methodius.  The school colors are red and gold in honor of the martyrdom and subsequent glory of St. Andrew. The school motto is "Magister Meus Christus," or "Christ is My Teacher."

History

Andrean High School first opened its doors to 337 students on September 14, 1959, creating a centrally-located Catholic High School between Bishop Noll Institute in Hammond, IN and Marquette Catholic High School in Michigan City, IN.  Bishop Leo Aloysius Pursley from the Diocese of Fort Wayne and Bishop Andrew Gregory Grutka from the newly formed Diocese of Gary were instrumental in its creation.

Demographics
The racial breakdown of the 588 students enrolled for the 2013–2014 school year was:
Asian – 4.5%
Black – 21.3%
Hispanic – 11.8%
White – 57.7%
Multiracial – 6.7%

Athletics
The school's teams are the Fighting '59ers. This name comes from the address of the school, 5959 Broadway, and the year of its founding- 1959. Andrean competes in the Northwest Crossroads Conference.  The following IHSAA sanctioned sports are offered:

Baseball (boys)
State champions – 2005, 2009, 2010, 2014, 2015, 2018, 2019 2022
Basketball (girls & boys)
State champions (boys) – 2019
Cross country (girls & boys)
Football (boys)
State champions – 2004, 2013, 2021
Golf (girls & boys)
Soccer (girls & boys)
State champions (girls) – 2016
Softball (girls)
State champions – 1998, 2007, 2012
Tennis (girls & boys)
Track (girls & boys)
Volleyball (girls)
State champions – 2017, 2021
Wrestling (boys)

Notable alumni
 Dawn LoVerde Brancheau – professional animal trainer
 Mike Brosseau – professional baseball player
 Carson Cunningham – Incarnate Word Cardinals Head Coach
 Dan Dakich – former Bowling Green Falcons men's basketball head coach (1997–2007)
 Luke Harangody – professional basketball player
 Robert “Mouse” Kolodzinski – college football player
 Sean Manaea – Major League Baseball player
 Rebecca Quick - co-host of CNBC's Squawk Box
 Pete Visclosky – member of the U.S. House of Representatives from Indiana's 1st congressional district (northwest Indiana)

See also
 List of high schools in Indiana

References

External links

 Andrean High School

Roman Catholic Diocese of Gary
Catholic secondary schools in Indiana
Private high schools in Indiana
Basilian schools
Schools in Lake County, Indiana
Educational institutions established in 1959
Merrillville, Indiana
1959 establishments in Indiana